Mike Galloway (born 1966) is a New Zealand international lawn bowler. He is a double National champion and represented New Zealand at the Commonwealth Games.

Bowls career
Galloway made his international debut in 1997 against Fiji. He has twice won the New Zealand National Bowls Championships, first in 2001, when winning the pairs with David Clark when bowling for Pakuranga and then 20 years later when winning the singles title bowling for Royal Oak.

Galloway was awarded the joint 2020-21 male New Zealand Player of the Year. In 2022, he was selected for the men's triples and men's fours events at the 2022 Commonwealth Games in Birmingham.

Personal life
Galloway is an Auckland-based greenkeeper by trade.

References

1966 births
Living people
New Zealand male bowls players
Bowls players at the 2022 Commonwealth Games
20th-century New Zealand people
21st-century New Zealand people